Nicolas Moreno de Alboran (born 14 July 1997) is an American tennis player. He has a career-high ATP singles ranking of World No. 188 achieved on 20 February 2023 and a doubles ranking of World No. 486, achieved on 9 August 2021. Moreno de Alboran has won one Challenger singles titles and five ITF doubles titles.

Moreno de Alboran had an excellent collegiate tennis career for University of California, Santa Barbara|UC Santa Barbara and made sporadic appearances on the ITF circuit while still in college. He turned professional in 2019 and, following a period of inactivity caused by the Covid-19 pandemic, progressed to regular appearances on the ATP Challenger Tour during the second half of the 2021 season.

Personal
Moreno de Alboran, a Spanish-American, was born in New York City. He moved to London as a teenager, where he attended Ibstock Place School in Roehampton, finishing in 2015. He trained at Dukes Meadows in Chiswick and represented Spain in junior events, then switched to the United States. He also played rugby and soccer while growing up.

Moreno de Alboran was a collegiate tennis player for UC Santa Barbara, where he was highly successful and ranked among the top 10 college players in the country during his senior year. He studied Environmental Science.

ATP Challenger and ITF Futures finals

Singles: 11 (4–7)

References

External links
 
 

Living people
1997 births
American male tennis players
Tennis people from New York (state)
UC Santa Barbara Gauchos men's tennis players
People educated at Ibstock Place School